Sivech-e Sofla (also Romanized as Sīvech-e Soflá; also known as Seyūch, Siuch, and Sīvech) is a village in Kani Sur Rural District, Namshir District, Baneh County, Kurdistan Province, Iran. At the 2006 census, its population was 788, in 148 families. The village is populated by Kurds.

References 

Towns and villages in Baneh County
Kurdish settlements in Kurdistan Province